Francisco Gabicagogueascoa Ibarra (31 December 1937 – 7 July 2014) was a professional road bicycle racer between 1961 and 1972.  Of his 21 professional victories, Gabica is most famous for winning the 1966 Vuelta a España, besting runnerup Eusebio Vélez and third-place finisher Carlos Echeverría, both compatriots. At the 1968 Vuelta, Gabica captured three mountainous stages to win the climbers classification.

Major results 
Source:

1961 
 2nd Overall Tour de l'Avenir
 7th Overall Euskal Bizikleta
1st Stage 5
1962 
 1st Klasika Primavera
 3rd Overall Euskal Bizikleta
 3rd GP Ayutamiento de Bilbao
 5th Overall Vuelta a España
 5th Subida a Arrate
 10th Overall Volta a Catalunya
1963 
 1st GP Torrelavega
 1st Stage 4 Grand Prix de Torrelavega
 5th Overall Vuelta a España
 5th Overall Euskal Bizikleta
 6th Overall Volta a Catalunya
 6th Grand Prix du Parisien
1964 
 1st Campeonato Vasco Navarro de Montaña 
 1st Prix de Pola de Lena
 2nd Subida a Arrate
 4th Overall Critérium du Dauphiné Libéré
1st Stage 7
 8th Overall Volta a Catalunya
1st Stage 3b
 9th Overall Vuelta a España
1965 
 1st Grand Prix de Zumaia
 1st Stages 2 & 6 Volta a la Comunitat Valenciana
 6th Overall Vuelta a España
 9th Overall Volta a Catalunya
1st Stages 1 & 5a 
 10th Overall Tour de France
1966 
 1st  Overall Vuelta a España
1st Stage 15a
 2nd Overall Gran Premio Fedrácion Catalana de Ciclismo
 3rd Overall Critérium du Dauphiné Libéré
1st Stage 1
 5th Overall Setmana Catalana de Ciclisme
 7th Overall Tour de France
 8th Trofeo Masferrer
1967 
 1st  Road race National Road Championships
 8th Overall Giro d'Italia
1st Stage 17
1968 
 1st  Mountains classification
 1st Stage 7 Volta a Catalunya
 3rd Overall Euskal Bizikleta
 8th Overall Giro d'Italia
 9th Trofeo Dicen
1969
 2nd Overall Tour of the Basque Country
 10th Overall Vuelta Ciclista a La Rioja
1970 
 1st GP Villafranca de Ordizia
 1st Mémorial Uriona
 1st Trophée Grutas San Jose
 4th Overall Vuelta a Mallorca
1971
 5th Overall Vuelta Ciclista al Pais Vasco

Grand Tour general classification results timeline

References

External links 

Official Tour de France results for Francisco Gabica

1937 births
2014 deaths
Spanish male cyclists
Vuelta a España winners
Spanish Vuelta a España stage winners
People from Lea-Artibai
Sportspeople from Biscay
Cyclists from the Basque Country (autonomous community)